State Route 106 (SR 106) is a  route in the south-central part of the state. The route begins at the Conecuh–Butler County line, serving as a continuation of Conecuh County Road 106 (CR 106). The eastern terminus of the route is at its junction with US 29 southwest of Brantley.

Route description
SR 106 traverses Butler and Crenshaw counties along a two-lane road.  As it leads across Butler County, the route travels eastwardly, continuing this trajectory until it crosses into Crenshaw County.  After crossing into Crenshaw County, the route turns southeastwardly until it reaches its terminus near Brantley.

History
Between 1962 and 1968, the section of SR 106 between its junctions with I-65 and US 31 saw significant traffic. The temporary northern terminus of the Interstate Highway route was at the interchange with SR 106, and motorists had to use the state route to connect with US 31, which parallels I-65 through Alabama.

Major intersections

References

106
Transportation in Butler County, Alabama
Transportation in Crenshaw County, Alabama